Willow Springs is a village in Cook County, Illinois, with a small portion in DuPage County. The village was founded in 1892, and was named for the springs along the Des Plaines River. Per the 2020 census, the population was 5,857.

Geography
Willow Springs is located on the banks of the Des Plaines River and the Chicago Sanitary and Ship Canal.

Demographics
As of the 2020 census there were 5,857 people, 2,303 households, and 1,494 families residing in the village. The racial makeup of the village was 81.85% White, 1.33% African American, 0.38% Native American, 3.45% Asian, 0.02% Pacific Islander, 3.93% from other races, and 9.05% from two or more races. Hispanic or Latino of any race were 12.21% of the population.

There were 2,303 households, out of which 45.90% had children under the age of 18 living with them, 57.27% were married couples living together, 5.08% had a female householder with no husband present, and 35.13% were non-families. 28.88% of all households were made up of individuals, and 10.94% had someone living alone who was 65 years of age or older. The average household size was 3.09 and the average family size was 2.44.

The village's age distribution consisted of 21.4% under the age of 18, 3.8% from 18 to 24, 22.9% from 25 to 44, 30.8% from 45 to 64, and 21.1% who were 65 years of age or older. The median age was 46.1 years. For every 100 females, there were 99.2 males. For every 100 females age 18 and over, there were 96.4 males.

The median income for a household in the village was $98,664, and the median income for a family was $123,531. Males had a median income of $61,136 versus $58,704 for females. The per capita income for the village was $51,333. About 3.1% of families and 2.6% of the population were below the poverty line, including 2.6% of those under age 18 and 2.3% of those age 65 or over.

Note: the US Census treats Hispanic/Latino as an ethnic category. This table excludes Latinos from the racial categories and assigns them to a separate category. Hispanics/Latinos can be of any race.

Government
Most of Willow Springs is in Illinois's 3rd congressional district, while the northwestern portion is in the 6th district. The current Mayor is Melissa Neddermeyer. The current Board of Village Trustees are:
Michael Kennedy (Term Expires 2025); Rick Mika (Term Expires 2025); Tom Arra (Term Expires 2025); Terrence M. Carr (Term Expires 2023); Ernie Moon (Term Expires 2023); and Fred Posch (Term Expires 2023).

Education
Several public elementary and middle school students attend Willow Springs School District 108, while others attend Pleasantdale Elementary and Pleasantdale Middle School in Pleasantdale School District 107. At the high school level, some District 108 students move onto Argo Community High School (District 217) in Summit, Illinois, and District 107 students move onto Lyons Township High School (District 204) in La Grange/Western Springs, IL. Another portion of District 108 students attend Amos Alonzo Stagg High School (Consolidated High School District 230) in Palos Hills, Illinois. Trinity Lutheran School is also in the area.

The College of DuPage serves residents north of the river while Moraine Valley Community College serves those south of the river.

Infrastructure

Transportation 
Willow Springs has a station on Metra's Heritage Corridor, which provides daily rail service between Joliet and Chicago Union Station.

Movie location
Willow Springs was used as a set location for the film The Lake House, starring Sandra Bullock and Keanu Reeves. Some locations in Willow Springs Il were used in filming scenes for the Amazon TV series Night Sky.

References

External links

Village website

Villages in Cook County, Illinois